The Oxcap-MH is a measure of health designed for use in clinical trials. It was based on a subset of questions developed by Anand et al (2009) and was first applied to evaluate community treatment orders by a team of researchers from Oxford and The Open University (Simon et al. 2013). The measure provides an alternative to the Eq5D and comprises more dimensions. The dimensions used were chosen in line with principles developed under the capability approach as used in philosophy, economics and international development. In 2020 it was used by White and van der Boor to assess the mental health of adults under lock-down.

References

Health economics
Health care quality
Questionnaire construction
Patient reported outcome measures